The Chadron Public Library, at 507 Bordeaux St. in Chadron, Nebraska, is a historic Carnegie library in a Classical Revival-style building designed by architect George A. Berlinghof.  It was listed on the National Register of Historic Places in 1990.

It was funded by a $5,000 Carnegie grant upon a second application, after first being rejected.  It was designed for just $100 by "noted Lincoln architect" George A. Berlinghof, who happened to be working in Chadron on a larger commission. The contractor was the Black Hills Company, a Deadwood architecture and contracting firm.

References

External links 
More photos of the Chadron Public Library at Wikimedia Commons

Libraries on the National Register of Historic Places in Nebraska
Neoclassical architecture in Nebraska
Buildings and structures in Dawes County, Nebraska
Libraries in Nebraska
Carnegie libraries in Nebraska
National Register of Historic Places in Dawes County, Nebraska